Mayville is a central-western suburb of Pretoria, South Africa (north of the CBD). It is also part of the so-called "Moot" community.

References

Suburbs of Pretoria